

Track listing
"Old Marcus Garvey"
"African Postman"
"Calling Rastafari"
"Jah No Dead"
"Pick Up The Pieces"
"Man In The Hills"
"We Go Deh"
"Jah Is My Driver / Slavery Days"
"Identity"
"Red, Gold And Green"

2004 live albums
Burning Spear live albums